Old Acquaintance is a 1940 play by the British writer John Van Druten.

After premiering in Boston, it ran for 170 performances at the Morosco Theatre on Broadway featuring Peggy Wood and Jane Cowl.  In Britain it had a tryout at the Theatre Royal, Bath before moving to the Apollo Theatre in the West End where it enjoyed a run of 218 performances from 18 December 1941 to 6 June 1942. The cast included Edith Evans, Muriel Pavlow and Ronald Ward.

Adaptations
In 1943 the play was adapted by Warner Bros. into a film of the same title directed by Vincent Sherman and starring Bette Davis, Miriam Hopkins and John Loder. In 1981 director George Cukor remade the story as Rich and Famous for United Artists, starring Jacqueline Bisset and Candice Bergen.

References

Bibliography
 Bordman, Gerald. American Theatre: A Chronicle of Comedy and Drama, 1930-1969. Oxford University Press, 1996.
 Goble, Alan. The Complete Index to Literary Sources in Film. Walter de Gruyter, 1999.
 Wearing, J.P. The London Stage 1940-1949: A Calendar of Productions, Performers, and Personnel.  Rowman & Littlefield, 2014.

1940 plays
Plays by John Van Druten
British plays adapted into films